The Online Bible (OLB) is a Bible Reference software package created in 1987 by Larry Pierce, who believed the Bible should be freely shared. Online Bible also provides a Mac version (for OS X 10.1 above) of its software. As of 2015, Online Bible is also available in App Store and Play Store.

Features 
 Multiple translations, commentaries 
 Unicode support for displaying foreign languages.
 650,000 cross references that automatically display according to the verse being researched.
 Built–in search feature.
 Basic package now runs in Linux Ubuntu using WineHQ.
 PocketPC version is included with the free basic package.

Version history 
 Version 1: 1987
 Version 2: January 19, 2005 
 Version 3: October 20, 2009, with Pocket PC program 
 Version 4: Support Unicode
 Version 5: January 5, 2016, with OlbLite for Mobile Devices

See also
 SABDA - Indonesian Online Bible

References

External links
Official Webpage
Mac and Linux OLB

Electronic Bibles
Classic Mac OS software